Sarcodon leucopus is a species of tooth fungus in the family Bankeraceae. Found in Asia and Europe, it was described as new to science in 1825 by Christian Hendrik Persoon. Mycologists Rudolph Arnold Maas Geesteranus and John Axel Nannfeldt transferred it to the genus Sarcodon in 1969. The surface texture, initially finely felt-like, later cracks to form shiny scales. Its color is pale purplish-brown to dark brown. Spines on the cap underside are up to 15 mm long and about 1 mm thick. The flesh has a disagreeable odor, and a bitter taste. Spores are roughly spherical, typically measuring 7.2–7.9 by 4.5–5.6 µm. The fungus is considered endangered in Switzerland.

Fruit bodies of Sarcodon leucopus contain novel compounds called sarcoviolins that have been shown to have antioxidative and α-glucosidase inhibitory activity.

References

External links

Fungi described in 1825
Fungi of Asia
Fungi of Europe
leucopus
Taxa named by Christiaan Hendrik Persoon